The Ireland–Scotland Professional Match was an annual men's professional golf competition between teams representing Ireland and Scotland. It was played from 1932 to 1936. The match was played on a single day with 10 players in each team who played 5 foursomes and 10 singles matches. The first match in 1932 was tied but Ireland won the next four contests.

History
The two countries played a match on 18 May 1907, just before the Irish Professional Championship. On that occasion the Scottish team was weak and Ireland won by 13 matches to 4.

The 1932 match was played as a match between the Irish and Scottish PGA Associations which meant that Mark Seymour, an Englishman, played for Scotland, where he was resident, and Sydney Fairweather, a Scot who was the professional at Malone Golf Club, played for Ireland.

In 1937 the two countries played each other during the Triangular Professional Tournament while in 1938 they met as part of the Llandudno International Golf Trophy. The 1937 and 1938 matches were both won by Scotland.

Results

Appearances
The following are those who played in at least one of the five matches. Sydney Fairweather played for Scotland in the England–Scotland Professional Match in 1933, 1935, 1936 and in the Llandudno International Golf Trophy in 1938. Mark Seymour played for England in the England–Scotland Professional Match in 1932 and 1933.

Ireland
 Denis Cassidy 1936
 Jimmy Cassidy 1934, 1935
 Fred Daly 1936
 Sydney Fairweather 1932
 John Hamill 1932, 1933, 1934, 1935
 Willie Holley 1933, 1934, 1935, 1936
 Paddy Mahon 1932, 1933, 1934, 1935, 1936
 Hugh McNeill 1932
 Joe McCartney 1932, 1933, 1934, 1935, 1936
 Matt McDermott 1932
 John McKenna 1933, 1935, 1936
 Willie Nolan 1932, 1933, 1934, 1935, 1936
 Willie O'Brien 1934, 1936
 Pat O'Connor 1932, 1933, 1934, 1935, 1936
 Moses O'Neill 1933, 1934
 Ernie Patterson 1933, 1934, 1935, 1936
 Charlie Pope 1932
 Philip Stevenson 1933, 1935, 1936
 Leo Wallace 1932

Scotland
 Tom Ainslie 1936
 Joe Anderson 1932
 Willam Anderson 1936
 Willie Callum 1935
 John Campbell 1936
 William Davis 1933, 1934, 1935, 1936
 Tom Dobson 1932, 1933, 1934, 1935, 1936
 Willie Don 1935, 1936
 Robert Dornan 1932
 Gordon Durward 1934
 Walter Fenton 1932, 1933
 Jim Forrester 1932, 1933, 1934, 1935, 1936
 Tom Haliburton 1935, 1936
 David Houston 1934
 George Hutton 1936
 Gordon Lockhart 1934, 1935
 Duncan McCulloch 1932, 1933, 1934, 1935
 Jimmy McDowall 1933, 1934, 1935, 1936
 Jack McMillan 1933, 1934
 Fred Robertson 1933
 Peter Robertson 1932
 Mark Seymour 1932
 George Smith 1932
 Willie Spark 1933, 1935
 Tom Wilson 1932, 1933, 1934

References

Team golf tournaments
Recurring sporting events established in 1932